Hajji Nowrush Kandi (also Romanized as Ḩājjī Nowrūsh Kandī; also known as Ḩājjī Norūsh Kandī) is a village in Qeshlaq-e Jonubi Rural District, Qeshlaq Dasht District, Bileh Savar County, Ardabil Province, Iran. At the 2006 census, its population was 70, in 14 families.

References 

Towns and villages in Bileh Savar County